Paraskevas Christou (Skevos) (born February 2, 1984) is a former Cypriot professional footballer who played as a central defender.

Honours
AEK Larnaca
Cypriot Cup: 2003–04
APOEL Nicosia
Cypriot Championship: 2008–09
Cypriot Super Cup: 2008
Omonia Nicosia
Cypriot Championship: 2009–10

External links
 

Living people
1984 births
People from Larnaca
Cypriot footballers
Cyprus international footballers
Association football defenders
AEK Larnaca FC players
APOEL FC players
AC Omonia players
Alki Larnaca FC players
FC Universitatea Cluj players
CS Pandurii Târgu Jiu players
Liga I players
Cypriot expatriate footballers
Expatriate footballers in Romania
Cypriot expatriate sportspeople in Romania
Cyprus youth international footballers
Cyprus under-21 international footballers